Ferric derisomaltose, sold under the brand name Monoferric, is a medication for the treatment of iron deficiency anemia (IDA) in adults who have intolerance to oral iron or have had unsatisfactory response to oral iron or who have non-hemodialysis dependent chronic kidney disease (NDD-CKD). It was approved for use in the United States in January 2020. It is given intravenously.

References

External links
 

Drugs acting on the blood and blood forming organs
Iron(III) compounds